Cecilia Heyes  (born 6 March 1960) is a British psychologist who studies the evolution of the human mind. She is a Senior Research Fellow in Theoretical Life Sciences at All Souls College, and a Professor of Psychology at the University of Oxford. She is also a Fellow of the British Academy (psychology and philosophy sections), and President of the Experimental Psychology Society.

Heyes is the author of Cognitive Gadgets: The Cultural Evolution of Thinking (2018), described by Tyler Cowen as "an important book and likely the most thoughtful of the year in the social sciences".

Heyes has argued that the picture presented by some evolutionary psychology of the human mind as a collection of cognitive instinctsorgans of thought shaped by genetic evolution over very long time periodsdoes not fit research results. She posits instead that humans have cognitive gadgets"special-purpose organs of thought" built in the course of development through social interaction. These are products of cultural rather than genetic evolution, and may develop and change much more quickly and flexibly than cognitive instincts.

In 2017, Heyes gave the Chandaria Lectures at the Institute of Philosophy, University of London. She has written for the Times Literary Supplement and given a number of radio and television interviews.

Early life 
Cecilia was the youngest of four children born to Helen Heyes (née Henneker) and James Heyes, who died in 1965. She credits her brother, Vincent Heyes, with having "taught his little sister how to argue, and how to enjoy doing itin the right companyabove nearly all things". She was the first member of her family to go to university.

Education 
After passing the eleven-plus exam, Heyes studied at Highworth Grammar School for Girls and then obtained a Bachelor of Science (1981) and PhD (1984) in psychology at University College London (UCL). In 2016 she was awarded a Doctor of Science, a higher doctorate, by the University of Oxford.

Career 

In her first postdoctoral research position (1984–1986), Heyes studied evolutionary epistemology, a blend of philosophy, evolutionary biology and cognitive science. Funded by a two-year Harkness Fellowship, she worked with Donald T. Campbell at Lehigh University, with William Wimsatt at the University of Chicago, and with Daniel Dennett at Tufts University.

Returning to the UK and to experimental psychology, from 1986–1989 Heyes was a Research Fellow of Trinity Hall, University of Cambridge. During this period she studied animal learning and cognition in the laboratory of Nicholas Mackintosh and Anthony R. Dickinson.

In 1988, Heyes started a 20-year period back at UCL, first as a lecturer in psychology, and later as a Senior Lecturer (1993), Reader (1996), and Professor (2000). Throughout the period she headed a laboratory studying social cognitionsocial learning, imitation, mirror neurons, and self-recognition. This experimental work, funded by the Leverhulme Trust, BBSRC, EPSRC, and ESRC, initially focused on nonhuman animalsrodents and birdsand later used behavioural and neurophysiological methods to examine cognitive processes in adult humans.

In 2008, Heyes gave up her lab and moved to All Souls College, University of Oxford, where she is a Senior Research Fellow in Theoretical Life Sciences. She is also a full professor affiliated with the Department of Experimental Psychology.

Heyes has collaborated with economists as a Fellow of the ESRC Centre for Economic Learning and Social Evolution (1995–2010), founded by Ken Binmore, and since 2010 as a member of the Scientific Council of the Institute of Advanced Study in Toulouse, directed by Paul Seabright.

She was awarded the British Psychological Society's Cognitive Section Prize in 2004, Fellowship of the British Academy in 2010, and Fellowship of the Cognitive Science Society in 2018. Heyes was President of the Experimental Psychology Society from 2018 to 2019.

In 2017 Heyes gave the Chandaria Lectures at the Institute of Philosophy, University of London, and in 2020 she is scheduled to give the Rudolf Carnap Lectures at the Institute of Philosophy, Ruhr-Universität Bochum.

Research 
Heyes works on the evolution of cognition, examining how genetic evolution, cultural evolution and learning combine to produce the mature cognitive abilities found in adult humans.

Her theories are based on experimental research in animal, cognitive, developmental and social psychology, cognitive neuroscience, and behavioral economics. Although insistent that our understanding of the evolution of cognition must be data-driven, she also draws on theorizing in the philosophy of mind and the philosophy of biology.

Heyes advances simple explanations for animal and human behavior. For example, her associative sequence learning model of imitation and mirror neurons suggests they are based on associative learning. However, she is not a fan of parsimony. She argues that, when a simple and a complex explanation both fit current data, scientists need to devise new experiments to test the theories against one another. We can't assume that the simple explanation is more likely to be right.

In common with evolutionary psychologists such as Steven Pinker, Leda Cosmides and John Tooby, Heyes works within the computational view of the mind, and assumes that genetic evolution has played a major role in shaping the minds and behavior of all animals. In contrast with other evolutionary psychologists, she argues that cultural evolution has been the principal architect of the human mind. Distinctively human cognitive mechanismssuch as language, imitation, theory of mind, episodic memory, causal understanding, morality, and explicit metacognitionare constructed in childhood through social interaction. These "cognitive gadgets" are built from and by "old parts"genetically inherited attentional, motivational, and learning processes that are present in a wide range of animals.

According to Heyes, "At birth, the minds of human babies are only subtly different from the minds of newborn chimpanzees. We are friendlier, our attention is drawn to different things, and we have a capacity to learn and remember that outstrips the abilities of newborn chimpanzees. Yet when these subtle differences are exposed to culture-soaked human environments, they have enormous effects. They enable us to upload distinctively human ways of thinking from the social world around us."

Heyes's "cultural evolutionary psychology" implies that the human mind is more fragile and more agile than previously assumed; more vulnerable to catastrophe, and better able to adapt to new technologies and ways of life. "In a skeletal, traumatized population, children would be unlikely to develop the Big Special cognitive mechanisms, such as causal understanding, episodic memory, imitation and mindreading. The capacity for cultural evolution, as well as the products of cultural evolution, would be lost." However "cultural evolutionary psychology ... suggests that distinctively human cognitive mechanisms are light on their feet, constantly changing to meet the demands of new social and physical environments. ... On the cognitive gadgets view, rather than taxing an outdated mind, new technologiessocial media, robotics, virtual realitymerely provide the stimulus for further cultural evolution of the human mind."

Cultural evolutionary studies are rapidly expanding. Unlike other cultural evolutionists, Heyes argues that it is not just what we think, but how we think, that is shaped by cultural evolution. Both the grist and the mills of the mind are cultural products.

Like dual-inheritance theorists, Heyes assumes that Darwinian selection plays an important role in cultural evolution; that the products of cultural evolution are sometimes adaptive; and that genetic and cultural evolution often work together. However, she argues that cultural selection has been the dominant force in shaping distinctively human cognitive mechanisms. She acknowledges the possibility of genetic assimilation, but finds little evidence that cognitive gadgets have been genetically assimilated.

Reception 
Daniel Dennett says that people who study animal behavior fall into two camps, 'romantics' and 'killjoys'. Heyes is regarded by romantics as a killjoy. Frans de Waal, a long-standing critic, believes that Heyes takes simple explanations for animal behavior too seriously, and engages in "theoretical acrobatics".

Evolutionary anthropologists, Dan Sperber and Olivier Morin, portray Heyes as a "a forceful critic of the Evolutionary Psychology approach defended by Cosmides, Tooby, Pinker and others", and commend her predictive power: "Having defended empiricism when the odds were lowest, Cecilia Heyes reaps the rewards of a series of wise bets". However, they argue that she over-estimates the influence of cultural, rather than genetic, evolution in shaping human cognition, and, using literacy and numeracy as examples, that her book Cognitive Gadgets does not provide compelling evidence for cultural selection rather than cultural diffusion of distinctively human cognitive mechanisms.

Tyler Cowen, an economist, wrote of Cognitive Gadgets: "think of this book as perhaps the best attempt so far to explain the weirdness of humans, relative to other animals", and "Highly recommended, it is likely to prove one of the most thought-provoking books of the year."

Economist Diane Coyle described Cognitive Gadgets as a new and "persuasive approach to thinking about decision-makingnot for example as a matter of setting up choices in ways that nudge flawed humans to do the right thing".

Reviewing Cognitive Gadgets in the arts journal Leonardo, Jan Baatens described the book as "an impressive and convincing intervention in the debate on what makes us human", and commends Heyes's style of thinking as "nuanced and cautious. The author does not make overgeneralizing claims, she is not looking for a new Grand Theory".

In 2019, a precis of Cognitive Gadgets was reviewed by 20–30 cognitive scientists, neuroscientists and philosophers in Behavioral and Brain Sciences.

Curiosities 
As Lord Mallard of All Souls College, Heyes is required to sing a medieval Mallard Song after two dinners each year. The dinners are attended only by fellows of the college.

Heyes chose the word 'gadgets' for culturally evolved cognitive mechanisms, in part, because she likes the sound of the wordalmost as much as the word 'rapture'.

Selected publications

Monograph 

 Heyes, C. M. (2018). Cognitive Gadgets: The Cultural Evolution of Thinking. Harvard University Press.

Edited books and special issues

 Heyes, C. M. & Galef, B. G. Eds. (1996) Social Learning and the Roots of Culture. Academic Press. Pp. 411.
 Heyes, C. M. & Huber, L. Eds. (2001) The Evolution of Cognition. MIT Press. Pp. 400.
 Heyes, C. M. & Hull, D.Eds. (2001) Selection Theory and Social Construction: The Evolutionary Naturalistic Epistemology of Donald T. Campbell. SUNY Press. Pp. 200.

Articles

References

External links 
 
 

Living people
1960 births
Fellows of All Souls College, Oxford
Fellows of the British Academy